Papillilabium beckleri, commonly known as the imp orchid, is the only species in the genus Papillilabium from the orchid family, Orchidaceae. It is a small, epiphytic orchid with many thin roots, between two and six linear leaves and up to eight pale green or brownish flowers. The flowers are fragrant, produce nectar and have a warty labellum. It grows on shrubs and trees in humid places and near streams and is found between south-east Queensland and the Sydney region in New South Wales.

Description
Flowering occurs from September to October.

Taxonomy and naming
The imp orchid was first formally described in 1873 by George Bentham from an unpublished description by Ferdinand von Mueller. Bentham gave it the name Cleisostoma beckleri and published the description in Flora Australiensis from a specimen collected by Hermann Beckler near the Clarence River. In 1967, Alick Dockrill changed the name to Papillilabium beckleri. The name Papillilabium is derived from the Latin words papilla meaning "nipple", "teat"or "bud" and labium meaning "lip". The specific epithet honours the collector of the type specimen.

Distribution and habitat
Papillilabium beckleri grows on shrubs and trees in humid places and near streams and is found between Mapleton in Queensland and the Royal National Park in New South Wales.

See also
 List of Orchidaceae genera

References

External links

Endemic orchids of Australia
Orchids of New South Wales
Orchids of Queensland
Monotypic Epidendroideae genera
Vandeae genera
Aeridinae
Plants described in 1873